Maureen Elizabeth Downey (May 1, 1921 – May 14, 2000) was an American zoologist who worked for three decades at the Smithsonian National Museum of Natural History. Known as "The Starfish Lady," she was an authority on sea stars and other echinoderms, co-founding the International Echinoderm Conference in 1972. Among her discoveries is Midgardia xandaros, the world's largest starfish.

Early life and education 

Maureen Downey was born in Washington, D.C., in 1921. She had an early fascination with animal biology, bringing insect specimens to be identified at the National Museum of Natural History.

She studied at George Washington University, then Duke University and the University of Washington's Friday Harbor Laboratories.

Career 

Downey was an international authority on echinoderms, particularly sea stars, earning her the nickname "The Starfish Lady." While she occasionally studied other groups, such as brittle stars, her work primarily focused on sea stars. Her work with echinoderms began in the 1940s, when she worked briefly at the Duke University Marine Laboratory in North Carolina.

She spent most of her career in her home city of Washington, first working for 10 years as a civil servant at the Central Intelligence Agency and then the United States Fish and Wildlife Service. In 1957, she was hired as a secretary at the Smithsonian's National Museum of Natural History. There, she worked her way into a museum technician role, returning to working with echinoderms. She was eventually promoted to museum specialist, working on the museum's collections and researching starfish. In her 30 years at the museum, she pushed to make the museum's echinoderm collection more accessible and published two comprehensive catalogs of echinoids and ophiuroids held in major collections across North America.

In 1967, she co-founded the Echinoderm Newsletter, and in 1972 she co-organized the first International Echinoderm Conference at the National Museum of Natural History. Downey discovered several new species of sea stars, notably the deep-water , which was confirmed as the world's biggest starfish. In 1992, she published the book Starfishes of the Atlantic. Co-written with Ailsa McGown Clark, it became a classic of the field.

She retired in 1987 to San Juan Island, where she lived until her death in 2000 at age 79.

Publications 

 1967 - Astronebris tatafilius (Euryalae: Asteronychidae), a new genus and species of Ophiuroid from the Aleutians, with a revised key to the family Asteronychidae. Proceedings of The Biological Society of Washington 80: 41–45. BHL
 1968 - A note on the Atlantic species of the starfish genus Linckia. Proceedings of the Biological Society of Washington 81: 41–44. BHL
 1968 - Catalog of recent Echinoid type specimens in the U.S. National Museum Smithsonian Institution and the Museum of Comparative Zoology Harvard University. Bulletin of the United States National Museum 264: 1-99. BHL
 1969 - Catalog of recent Ophiuroid type specimens in major collections in the United States. Bulletin of the United States National Museum 293: 1–239. BHL
 1970 - Zorocallida, New Order, and Doraster constellatus, New Genus and Species, with Notes on the Zoroasteridae (Echinodermata; Asteroidea). Smithsonian contributions to Zoology 64: 1-18. SI-repository
 1970 - Drachmaster bullisi new genus and species of Ophidiasteridae (Echinodermata, Asteroidea), with a key to the Caribbean species of the family. Proceedings of the Biological Society of Washington 83(6): 77–82. BHL
 1970 - Marsipaster acicula, new species (Asteroidea: Echinodermata), from the Caribbean and Gulf of Mexico. Proceedings of the Biological Society of Washington 83(28): 309–312. BHL
 1971 - A new species of the genus Solaster (Echinodermata: Asteroidea). Proceedings of the Biological Society of Washington 84(4): 39–42. BHL
 1971 - Two new species of the genus Tamaria (Echinodermata: Asteroidea) from the Tropical Western Atlantic. Proceedings of the Biological Society of Washington 84(5): 43–50. BHL
 1971 - Ampheraster alaminos, a new species of the family Asteriidae (Echinodermata: Asteroidea) from the Gulf of Mexico. Proceedings of the Biological Society of Washington 84(6): 51–54. BHL
 1972 - Midgardia xandaros new genus, new species, a large brisingid starfish from the Gulf of Mexico. Proceedings of the Biological Society of Washington 84(48): 421–426. BHL
 1973 - Starfishes from the Caribbean and the Gulf of Mexico. Smithsonian contributions to Zoology 126: 1–158. SI-repository
 1975 - Asteroidea from Malpelo Island with a description of a new species of the genus Tamaria. in: . The biological investigation of Malpelo Island, Colombia. Smithsonian contributions to Zoology 176: 86–90. SI-repository
On the genera Echinaster Mueller and Troschel, and Othilia Gray, and the validity of Verrillaster Downey. (Echinodermata: Asteroidea). Proceedings of the Biological Society of Washington 90(4): 829–830. BHL
 1979 - Pythonaster pacificus n.sp. a new starfish of the family Myxasteridae (Echinodermata: Asteroidea). Proceedings of the Biological Society of Washington 92(1): 70–74. BHL
 1979 - Hymenaster kieri, a new species of starfish of the family Pterasteridae (Echinodermata: Asteroidea). Proceedings of the Biological Society of Washington 92(4): 801–803. BHL
 1980 - Floriaster maya, new genus and species of the family Goniasteridae. Proceedings of the Biological Society of Washington 93(2): 346–349. BHL
 1981 - A new goniasterid seastar, Evoplosoma scorpio (Echinodermata: Asteroidea), from the northeastern Atlantic. Proceedings of the Biological Society of Washington 94(2): 561–563. BHL
 1982 - Evoplosoma virgo, a new goniasterid starfish (Echinodermata: Asteroidea) from the Gulf of Mexico. Proceedings of the Biological Society of Washington 95(4): 772–773. BHL
 1986 - Revision of the Atlantic Brisingida (Echinodermata: Asteroidea), with description of a new genus and family. Smithsonian contributions to Zoology 435: 1-57. SI-repository
 1992 - with Ailsa McGown Clark. Starfishes of the Atlantic.

References 

1921 births
2000 deaths
20th-century American zoologists
Women zoologists
20th-century American women scientists
American marine biologists
Smithsonian Institution people
George Washington University alumni
Scientists from Washington, D.C.
Duke University alumni
University of Washington alumni